The Olympic League is a high school athletic league that is part of the CIF Southern Section, which is composed of private schools.

Members
 Heritage Christian School (North Hills)
 Maranatha High School (Pasadena)
 Valley Christian High School (Cerritos)
 Village Christian School (Sun Valley)
 Whittier Christian High School (La Habra)

References

CIF Southern Section leagues